Ayu Bulantrisna Djelantik (September 8, 1947 – February 24, 2021) was a Dutch-born Indonesian traditional Balinese dancer, ENT specialist, and a lecturer at the faculty of medicine at Padjadjaran University.

Early life and education
Bulantrisna was born as the first child of five siblings, from the Balinese-Dutch couple Dr. A.A. Made Djelantik and Astri Henriette Zwart. Her father was the son of I Gusti Bagus Jelantik, the raja of the Karangasem Regency. Her mother was the daughter of the famous Dutch designer Piet Zwart, a proponent of the De Stijl movement. Bulantrisna's father was studying in the Netherlands during the Indonesian independence upheaval, where he met his future wife. As a WHO malariologist and head of the Bali Health Department, Dr. Djelantik worked in many places across Indonesia and abroad.

Bulantrisna spent her childhood in Bali, where her father summoned traditional dance experts who taught her and her siblings classical Balinese dances. She then continued her medical studies in Bandung, Indonesia, and she had a career as a doctor and lived abroad for some years including in the United States.

Career 
She came back to Indonesia after four years abroad and lived in Bandung. She taught at the Faculty of Medicine, Padjadjaran University, and worked as an otolaryngologist. Bulantrisna was also the chair of the Southeast Asia Society for Sound Hearing.

Bulantrisna founded a dance studio called Bengkel Tari Ayu Bulan (Ayu Bulan's Dance Workshop), which is still active in conducting workshops and performing in Indonesia as well as in many other countries. She performed mainly classical legong dances with her dance troupe, based in Jakarta. She also collaborated in choreography with others, such as with Retno Maruti, the master of classical Javanese dances.

Aside from dances, Bulantrisna also supported Indonesian film and film making with Balitaksu Foundation, and publishing art and children literature with Saritaksu Publications.

Personal life 
Bulantrisna died on February 24, 2021, of pancreatic cancer.

See also
 Legong

References

1947 births
2021 deaths
Indonesian female dancers
Indonesian physicians
Otolaryngologists
Indonesian women academics
Academic staff of Padjadjaran University
Indo people
Balinese people
People from Deventer
People from Bandung
Deaths from pancreatic cancer
Deaths from cancer in Indonesia
Indonesian people of Dutch descent